The Effingham Teutopolis Christmas Classic is a High School holiday basketball tournament held annually for three days following Christmas. Consisting of teams from the Chicago area, Central Illinois, and Southern Illinois, the tournament games are played at venues in both Teutopolis and Effingham.

2019 Teams 

Teutopolis Pool - Lincoln Way East, Mattoon, St. Anthony, Pleasant Plains, Oak Lawn, Lawrenceville, Teutopolis, Chicago Brooks

Effingham Pool - Champaign Centennial, Antioch, Central A & M, Charleston, Chicago Corliss, Dixon, Effingham, Sacred Hart Griffin

2019 Schedule 

Thursday, December 26 through Saturday, December 28
Full 2019 Schedule with Location and Times

History 

The first inaugural tournament took place on December 27 and 28, 2013. Since its inception, the tournament has expanded to include a variety of Illinois regions and  demographics, creating a unique blend of competitive balance.

Past Champions 
2013 Teutopolis Wooden Shoes
2014 Mount Vernon Rams
2015 Teutopolis Wooden Shoes
2016 Teutopolis Wooden Shoes
2017 Chicago Corliss Trojans
2018 Teutopolis Wooden Shoes
2019  Lincoln Way East Griffins

References

External links
Official site - most of the information is in the archive sections

Basketball in Illinois